Dustin Brown was the defending champion, but he chose to compete in Istanbul challenger instead.
Andrej Martin won the title, after won 6–4, 7–5 against his compatriot Marek Semjan in the final.

Seeds

  Blaž Kavčič (quarterfinals)
  Óscar Hernández (first round)
  Andrey Kuznetsov (second round)
  Guillaume Rufin (first round)
  Evgeny Kirillov (second round)
  Andrej Martin (champion)
  Marek Semjan (final)
  Andis Juška (semifinals, retired due to stomach ache)

Draw

Finals

Top half

Bottom half

References
 Main Draw
 Qualifying Draw

2010 ATP Challenger Tour
2010 Singles